Mount Overill is a volcanic peak in southwestern British Columbia, Canada, located  east of Rivers Inlet and  northwest of Mount Somolenko.

See also
 List of volcanoes in Canada
 Volcanism of Canada
 Volcanism of Western Canada

References

Overill
Volcanoes of British Columbia
Pacific Ranges
Range 2 Coast Land District